Oegoconia is a moth genus in the family Autostichidae.

Species
 Oegoconia annae Sutter, 2007
 Oegoconia ariadne Gozmány, 1988
 Oegoconia caradjai Popescu-Gorj & Capuse, 1965
 Oegoconia ceres Sutter, 2007
 Oegoconia deauratella (Herrich-Schäffer, 1854)
 Oegoconia deluccai Amsel, 1952
 Oegoconia huemeri Sutter, 2007
 Oegoconia meledantis (Meyrick, 1921)
 Oegoconia novimundi (Busck, 1915)
 Oegoconia praeramis Meyrick, 1918
 Oegoconia quadripuncta (Haworth, 1828)
 Oegoconia syndesma Meyrick, 1926
 Oegoconia uralskella Popescu-Gorj & Capuse, 1965

References

External links
Images representing Oegoconia  at Consortium for the Barcode of Life

 
Oegoconiinae